Avrankou  is a town, arrondissement, and commune in the Ouémé Department of south-eastern Benin. The commune covers an area of 150 square kilometres and as of 2013 had a population of 128,050 people.

Avrankou is home to a constituent monarchy, currently led by Latchè Holou Guidimadégbé.

References

External links 

Communes of Benin
Arrondissements of Benin
Populated places in the Ouémé Department